Tattariharju, known as Tattaråsen in Swedish, is a northern neighbourhood of Helsinki, Finland.

Neighbourhoods of Helsinki